This is a list of Murdo mountains in Scotland by height.

British Isles cartographer Alan Dawson, first compiled the list of Murdos in 1995 to provide an objective and quantitative alternative to the more qualitative Scottish Mountaineering Club ("SMC") definition of a Munro. Unlike all other Scottish mountain and hill classifications, the SMC does not maintain an official list of Murdos. However, all Murdos are either SMC Munros or SMC Munro Tops.

, there were 442 Murdos identified in Scotland.

Murdo mountains by height

The list below was downloaded from the Database of British and Irish Hills ("DoBIH") as at October 2018.  Note that topological prominence, unlike topological elevation, is far more complex to measure and requires a survey of the entire contours of a peak, rather than a single point of height.  These tables are therefore subject to being revised over time, and should not be amended or updated unless the entire DoBIH data is re–downloaded again.  The DoBIH classification marks Munros ("M") and Munro Tops ("MT").

Bibliography

DoBIH codes

The DoBIH uses the following codes for the various classifications of mountains and hills in the British Isles, which many of the above peaks also fall into:

See also

List of mountains of the British Isles by height
Lists of mountains and hills in the British Isles
Lists of mountains in Ireland
List of Munro mountains in Scotland
List of Corbetts (mountains)
List of Grahams (mountains)
List of Donald mountains in Scotland
List of Furth mountains in the British Isles
List of P600 mountains in the British Isles
List of Marilyns in the British Isles

Notes

References

External links
The Database of British and Irish Hills (DoBIH), the largest database of British Isles mountains
Hill Bagging UK & Ireland, the searchable interface for the DoBIH
The Relative Hills of Britain, a website dedicated to mountain and hill classification

Murdos